Hong Kong Wetland Park is a conservation, education and tourism facility, located at the northern part of Tin Shui Wai, in Yuen Long. It was to be an ecological mitigation area (EMA) for the wetlands lost due to Tin Shui Wai New Town development.

The Hong Kong Wetland Park comprises a  visitor centre, Wetland Interactive World, and a  Wetland Reserve. The Wetland Interactive World has themed exhibition galleries, a theatre, a souvenir shop, an indoor play area (swamp adventure) and a resource centre.

History 
In 1998, a project named International Wetland Park and Visitor Centre Feasibility Study was initiated by the Agriculture, Fisheries and Conservation Department and the Hong Kong Tourism Board with a view to expanding the ecological mitigation area to a wetland ecotourism attraction. After concluding that it was feasible to develop a Wetland Park at the site without compromising its ecological mitigation functions, and that development of the Wetland Park would also enhance the ecological function of the site to a conservation, education and tourism facility, the concerned parties started the Wetland Park Project, which is one of the Millennium projects of the Administrations.

In 2007, the park was one of five winners of the Awards for Excellence: Asia Pacific Competition, from the Urban Land Institute.

Facilities
Themed exhibition galleries with floor areas ranging from  showcase the importance of wetland on biodiversity, civilisation and conservation. Visitors can learn more about the native flora and fauna of Hong Kong through the animals and models displayed in the Living Wetland Gallery, such as false gharial, mouse deer and green turtle.

The Wetland Reserve consists of re-created habitats designed for water fowls and other wildlife. The Wetland Discovery Centre, located in the Wetland Reserve, provides visitors more hands-on experience on local wetlands. Other facilities include Stream Walk, Succession Walk, Mangrove Boardwalk and three bird hides situated next to the fish pond, mudflat and riverside, leading visitors to venture habitats of wildlife such as fiddler crab, mudskipper and the rare black-faced spoonbill.

Pui Pui Home

Pui Pui is a crocodile's name, which is a Chinese pun indicating that it came from Shan Pui River and is the apple of the public's eye.

On 29 August 2006, she was moved into her landscaped enclosure and can be easily viewed by the public. Pui Pui's Home was designed to provide the reptile with a healthy and comfortable living environment.

Outdoor facilities include some infra-red heaters, a heat pad and a weighing scale. Water in the pool is continuously circulated through a filtration system.

Transportation

Wetland Park is served by the MTR Light Rail, and the Wetland Park stop and Tin Sau stop belong to Zone 5A for single-ride ticket.

Routes
705: Tin Shui Wai Circular (Counter-Clockwise)
706: Tin Shui Wai Circular (Clockwise)
 761P: Yuen Long to Tin Wing (Limited special service: departing from each terminal every 30 minutes 1000–1500 daily. Normal service terminates at Tin Yat instead of Tin Wing.)

See also
 Nam Sang Wai
 Fung Lok Wai
 List of buildings and structures in Hong Kong
 Hong Kong Country Parks & Special Areas

References

External links

Wetlands of Hong Kong
Wetland Park
Tin Shui Wai
Yuen Long District
Tourist attractions in Hong Kong
Zoos in Hong Kong